Outlaws of Red River is a 1927 American silent Western film directed by Lewis Seiler and written by Harold Shumate and Malcolm Stuart Boylan. The film stars Tom Mix, Marjorie Daw, Arthur Clayton, William Conklin, Duke R. Lee, and Francis McDonald. The film was released on May 8, 1927, by Fox Film Corporation.

Cast
 Tom Mix as Tom Morley
 Marjorie Daw as Mary Torrence
 Arthur Clayton as Sam Hardwick
 William Conklin as Captain Dunning
 Duke R. Lee as Dick Williams
 Francis McDonald as Ben Tanner
 Lee Shumway as Mr. Torrence 
 Ellen Woonston as Mrs. Torrence
 Jimmy Downs as Tom Morley
 Virginia Marshall as Mary as a child
 Mark Hamilton as an outlaw (uncredited)

References

External links
 
 

1927 films
1920s English-language films
Fox Film films
1927 Western (genre) films
Films directed by Lewis Seiler
American black-and-white films
Silent American Western (genre) films
1920s American films